Taina Halasima (born 11 December 1997) is a Tongan sprinter. She competed in the women's 100 metres event at the 2016 Summer Olympics.

References

External links
 

1997 births
Living people
Tongan female sprinters
Place of birth missing (living people)
Athletes (track and field) at the 2016 Summer Olympics
Olympic athletes of Tonga